Kim Ok-cheol (or  ; born 16 November 1994) is a South Korean road and track cyclist, who most recently rode for UCI Continental team . He won the bronze medal in the team pursuit at the 2016 Asian Cycling Championships.

Major results
Source: 

2015
 National Road Championships
1st  Under-23 road race
2nd Road race
 4th Overall Jelajah Malaysia
1st  Young rider classification
 4th Overall Tour of Thailand
2016
 1st Stage 6 Tour of Thailand
 1st Stage 2 Tour of Fuzhou
 3rd  Team pursuit, Asian Track Championships
 6th Road race, Asian Road Championships
2017
 Asian Track Championships
2nd  Team pursuit
3rd  Omnium
 3rd Road race, National Road Championships
 6th Overall Tour of Thailand
2018
 2nd  Madison, Asian Games (with Park Sang-hoon)
 Asian Track Championships
2nd  Team pursuit
3rd  Madison (with Im Jae-yeon)
2019
 Asian Track Championships
1st  Madison (with Im Jae-yeon)
1st  Team pursuit

References

External links
 
 
 

1994 births
Living people
South Korean track cyclists
South Korean male cyclists
Sportspeople from Daegu
Cyclists at the 2016 Summer Olympics
Olympic cyclists of South Korea
Asian Games medalists in cycling
Cyclists at the 2018 Asian Games
Medalists at the 2018 Asian Games
Asian Games silver medalists for South Korea
20th-century South Korean people
21st-century South Korean people